Junior Mance Trio at the Village Vanguard is a live album by jazz pianist Junior Mance which was recorded at the Village Vanguard in 1961 and released on the Jazzland label.

Reception

The contemporaneous DownBeat reviewer wrote that the album was inferior to The Soulful Piano of Junior Mance, because it lacked emotion and individuality. The AllMusic site awarded the album 4½ stars stating: "Mance's many fans have no reason to despair though for, in addition to a boppish rendition of "Girl of My Dreams", the pianist does perform a generous amount of blues and soulful pieces".

Track listing
All compositions by Junior Mance except where noted.
 "Looptown" - 5:05  
 "Letter from Home" - 4:50  
 "Girl of My Dreams" (Sunny Clapp) - 4:01  
 "63rd Street Theme" (Johnny Griffin) - 6:17  
 "Smokey Blues" - 6:36  
 "9:20 Special" (William Engvick, Earle Warren) - 5:10  
 "Bingo Domingo" (Eddie "Lockjaw" Davis) - 4:41  
 "You Are Too Beautiful" (Lorenz Hart, Richard Rodgers) - 5:30

Personnel
Junior Mance - piano
Larry Gales - bass
Ben Riley - drums

References

1961 live albums
Junior Mance live albums
Jazzland Records (1960) albums
Albums produced by Orrin Keepnews
Albums recorded at the Village Vanguard